William Calvin Matthews (January 12, 1878 – January 23, 1946) was a right-handed pitcher in Major League Baseball who played briefly for the Boston Red Sox during the 1909 season. He was born in Mahanoy City, Pennsylvania.

Matthews posted a 3.24 ERA in five appearances, including one start, six strikeout, 10 walks, 16 hits allowed, and 16.2 innings of work. He did not have a decision.

Matthews died in Mount Carbon, Pennsylvania, at age 68.

External links

Retrosheet

1878 births
1946 deaths
People from Mahanoy City, Pennsylvania
Boston Red Sox players
Major League Baseball pitchers
Baseball players from Pennsylvania
Buffalo Bisons (minor league) players
York Penn Parks players
York White Rozes players
Reading Pretzels players
Trenton Tigers players
Wilkes-Barre Barons (baseball) players